Pama is a department or commune of Kompienga Province in Burkina Faso. Its capital is the town of Pama.

Cities 
The department is made up of a city chief town of the department (and the province):

 Pama (divided into 4 sectors)

and 14 villages:

 Bombontangou
 Folpodi
 Kabonga-I
 Kabonga-II
 Kalmama (or Signoghin )
 Koalou
 Kompiembiga
 Kpadiari
 Nadiagou
 Niorgou-I
 Niorgou-II
 Oumpougdéni
 Tibadi
 Tin.

References 

Departments of Burkina Faso
Kompienga Province